Jonathan Richard Ayling (born 13 June 1967) is a retired English cricketer. He was highly regarded all-rounder, a right-handed batsman and a right-armed seam bowler.

Ayling was educated at Portsmouth Grammar School where in 1985 he won 'The Cricket Society Wetherall Award for the Leading All-Rounder in English Schools Cricket'.
 
Ayling made his Hampshire List-A debut for the county against Somerset in 1987. That season he represented the county in two one-day matches.
 
Ayling made his first-class cricket debut in the 1988 county season against Oxford University taking a wicket with his first ball and his first eight scoring shots were boundaries . The same season Ayling won his first honour with the club when he was part of the Benson and Hedges Cup winning team that defeated Derbyshire at Lord's Cricket Ground.  Ayling took a single wicket in the final and was not requested to bat as Hampshire won by seven wickets. It was Hampshire's first Cup Final at Lords. He was awarded Hampshire Player Of The Year in 1988.
 
During a pre season friendly,in April 1989 against Sussex he was involved in a collision with batsman David Smith (Surrey, Worcestershire, Sussex and England) whilst fielding which resulted in Ayling requiring knee reconstructive surgery and missing over a season of cricket.
 
Ayling would also go onto win the 1991 NatWest Trophy when Hampshire defeated Surrey County Cricket Club by four wickets, with Ayling taking two wickets: those of Alec Stewart and Darren Bicknell. Ayling hit the winning runs in the last over bowled by Martin Bicknell.  His final honour came in the 1992 Benson and Hedges Cup when Hampshire defeated Kent County Cricket Club by 41 runs, with Ayling taking one wicket and another economical spell in the Kent innings.
 
After seven seasons with the club,Ayling decided to retire from Hampshire at the end of the 1993 County Championship following his serious knee injury that required numerous major operations. Ayling represented Hampshire in 60 first-class matches scoring 2,082 runs at an average of 26.96. His first-class bowling figures were impressive with Ayling taking 134 wickets at an average of 25.41. Ayling also represented the club in 94 one-day matches, scoring 1,028 runs at an average of 22.84. His bowling in one-day matches yielded 93 wickets at an average of 35.91.
 
Ayling was appointed as a Cricket Professional at Winchester College for 5 years before returning to Hampshire as their Fast Bowling Coach/ Assistant Coach for a number of years.  He decided to accept the role of Cricket Professional at Dauntsey's School in Wiltshire in 2012, before returning to Portsmouth Grammar School in 2021 in the same capacity. He lives near Salisbury with his wife and two children.

External links
Jon Ayling on Cricinfo
Jon Ayling on CricketArchive
Matches and detailed statistics for Jon Ayling

1967 births
Living people
Cricketers from Portsmouth
English cricketers
Hampshire cricketers
English cricket coaches